Winthrop Harbor is a village in Lake County, Illinois, United States. Winthrop Harbor is considered the corner stone of Illinois. Per the 2020 census, the population was 6,705. It is located along the northern border of Illinois and is part of the Chicago metropolitan area. Winthrop Harbor is known for its North Point Marina, and is a warning demarcation point for the National Weather Service's marine warnings for Lake Michigan. With moorage over 1,500 boats, it is the largest marina on the Great Lakes. Nearly one million visitors take advantage of the marina, its associated beaches and other recreational facilities every summer.

History
Winthrop Harbor was named after Winthrop, Massachusetts.

In 1918, the Saturday Evening Post had an article about the truck manufacturing plant in Winthrop Harbor.  At the time, the Winther plant had been in operation for one year.

Geography

Demographics

2020 census

Note: the US Census treats Hispanic/Latino as an ethnic category. This table excludes Latinos from the racial categories and assigns them to a separate category. Hispanics/Latinos can be of any race.

2010 Census
As of the 2010 United States Census, there were 6,742 people living in the village. The racial makeup of the village was 90.94% White, 1.44% Black or African American, 2.31% Asian, 0.39% Native American, 0.01% Pacific Islander, 2.03% of some other race and 2.88% of two or more races. 7.64% were Hispanic or Latino (of any race).

As of the census of 2000, there were 6,670 people, 2,370 households, and 1,884 families living in the village. The racial makeup of the village was 93.79% White, 0.57% African American, 0.49% Native American, 1.90% Asian, 0.01% Pacific Islander, 1.51% from other races, and 1.71% from two or more races. Hispanic or Latino of any race were 4.54% of the population.

There were 2,370 households, out of which 40.1% had children under the age of 18 living with them, 66.8% were married couples living together, 8.4% had a female householder with no husband present, and 20.5% were non-families. 17.0% of all households were made up of individuals, and 5.1% had someone living alone who was 65 years of age or older. The average household size was 2.81 and the average family size was 3.17.

In the village, the population was spread out, with 27.4% under the age of 18, 8.1% from 18 to 24, 31.2% from 25 to 44, 25.2% from 45 to 64, and 8.1% who were 65 years of age or older. The median age was 36 years. For every 100 females, there were 100.4 males. For every 100 females age 18 and over, there were 97.8 males.

The median income for a household in the village was $72,795, and the median income for a family was $79,442. Males had a median income of $44,795 versus $32,392 for females. The per capita income for the village was $24,256. About 1.9% of families and 3.1% of the population were below the poverty line, including 3.1% of those under age 18 and 4.2% of those age 65 or over.

Transportation

Major streets
  Sheridan Road
 9th Street
 Lewis Avenue
 Russell Road
 Kenosha Road
 7th Street

Rail
Winthrop Harbor is served by Metra's Union Pacific / North Line, at Winthrop Harbor Metra station.

Public services
The village of Winthrop Harbor has a full-time police department and a part-time fire department.

Police department
The Winthrop Harbor Police Department's full-time officers are supplemented by part-time officers in both Patrol and Specialist positions.  The department offers the following bureaus: Patrol, Detectives, Sex Crimes, Communications, CyberCrime, Records, and Evidence/Property. The current Chief is Edward Mohn.

Fire department
The Winthrop Harbor Fire Department, founded in 1949, has grown from a small volunteer force to a 24-hour-a-day operation.  Currently, part-time employees work overlapping shifts providing a crew 24-hours a day, 7 days a week.  These 'on-duty' crews are supplemented with off-duty personnel who respond from home.  They work with two engines, a 75-foot ladder truck, two advanced life support ambulances, one brush unit, a rescue boat and a staff and command car. Through automatic aid agreements with the surrounding area, the Village receives optimal emergency service.  The current Fire Chief is Rocco Campanella.

Pollution concerns 
 In a study released on July 30, 2009 by Forbes.com, Winthrop Harbor's North Point Marina was reported as the seventh most polluted beach in the United States based on samples taken in 2008.  North Point Marina has been on this list since 2005, exceeding acceptable contamination levels in 61 percent of tests.
In 2006, a test taken at the local beach stated that this is one of the most polluted beaches on the Great Lakes. It has 89% unhealthy water. (89/100 tests)

References

External links
Village of Winthrop Harbor
Winthrop Harbor Chamber of Commerce
Winthrop Harbor Tourism http://www.explorewinthropharbor.com

Villages in Illinois
Villages in Lake County, Illinois